The 2019 Budapest Formula 2 round was a pair of motor races held on 3 and 4 August 2019 at the Hungaroring in Mogyoród, Hungary as part of the FIA Formula 2 Championship. It was the eighth round of the 2019 FIA Formula 2 Championship and was run in support of the 2019 Hungarian Grand Prix.

Classification

Qualifying

Notes
 – Sean Gelael served a three-place grid penalty that was due to be served at the previous round at Silverstone before he withdrew from the race.
 – Anthoine Hubert and Tatiana Calderón were excluded from the qualifying results and had their lap times deleted for failing to comply with the tyre nomination information supplied to the FIA. The stewards gave them permission to start the race.

Feature race

Notes
 – Sean Gelael was given a five-second time penalty for speeding in the pit lane.

Sprint race

Championship standings after the round

Drivers' Championship standings

Teams' Championship standings

References

External links 
 

Budapest
Budapest Formula 2
Budapest Formula 2